The 2004 Meath Senior Football Championship was the 112th edition of the Meath GAA's premier club Gaelic football tournament for senior graded teams in County Meath, Ireland. The tournament consists of 16 teams, with the winner going on to represent Meath in the Leinster Senior Club Football Championship. The championship starts with a group stage and then progresses to a knock out stage.  
 
Blackhall Gaels were the defending champions after they defeated Simonstown Gaels in the previous years final.

Navan O'Mahonys were promoted after claiming the 2003 Meath Intermediate Football Championship title, their second Intermediate win.

On 10 October 2004, Skryne claimed their 12th Senior Championship title when they defeated Simonstown Gaels 1-9 to 0-7. John Quinn raised the Keegan Cup for Skryne while Mick O'Dowd claimed the 'Man of the Match' award.

Gaeil Colmcille were relegated after 18 years in the senior grade.

Team changes
The following teams have changed division since the 2003 championship season.

To S.F.C.
Promoted from I.F.C.
 Navan O'Mahonys  -  (Intermediate Champions)

From S.F.C.
Relegated to I.F.C.
 Ballivor

Group stage
There are 2 groups called Group A and B. The 4 top finishers in Group A and B will qualify for the quarter finals. The 2 teams that finish last in their groups will play in a relegation play off.

Group A

Round 1:
 Trim 1-7, 0-9 Skryne, Pairc Tailteann,
 Simonstown Gaels 0-11, 0-7 Ballinlough, 
 Dunshaughlin 1-6, 0-5 St. Peter's Dunboyne, Pairc Tailteann,
 Navan O'Mahonys 1-13, 1-7 Gaeil Colmcille, Carlanstown,

Round 2:
 Trim 2-11, 1-10 St. Peter's Dunboyne,
 Simonstown Gaels 1-12, 0-15 Skryne, Pairc Tailteann,
 Dunshaughlin 3-12, 0-5 Gaeil Colmcille, Pairc Tailteann,
 Navan O'Mahonys 2-9, 0-8 Ballinlough, Carlanstown,

Round 3:
 Trim 2-14, 1-8 Gaeil Colmcille, Athboy,
 Simonstown Gaels 1-15, 0-6 Navan O'Mahonys, Pairc Tailteann, 
 Skryne 2-11, 0-12 St. Peter's Dunboyne, Dunshaughlin,         
 Ballinlough 0-9, 0-8 Dunshaughlin, Simonstown,

Round 4:
 Trim 1-10, 0-4 Ballinlough, Athboy,        
 Dunshaughlin 2-9, 0-8 Simonstown Gaels, Pairc Tailteann,         
 Navan O'Mahonys 1-13, 0-10 Skryne, Pairc Tailteann,
 St. Peter's Dunboyne 1-13, 0-8 Gaeil Colmcille,

Round 5:
 Trim 2-9, 0-9 Simonstown Gaels, Pairc Tailteann,  
 Skryne 1-13, 0-6 Gaeil Colmcille, 
 Dunshaughlin 0-12, 1-9 Navan O'Mahonys, Pairc Tailteann, 
 St. Peter's Dunboyne 2-10, 1-8 Ballinlough,

Round 6:
 Trim 0-9, 1-2 Navan O'Mahonys, Pairc Tailteann,
 Simonstown Gaels 2-9, 1-9 St. Peter's Dunboyne, Dunshaughlin,
 Skryne 0-13, 0-12 Dunshaughlin, Ratoath,
 Ballinlough 0-10, 1-4 Gaeil Colmcille,

Round 7:
 Trim 1-7, 0-7 Dunshaughlin, Pairc Tailteann,
 Simonstown Gaels 5-13, 1-2 Gaeil Colmcille,
 Skryne 2-13, 1-5 Ballinlough, 
 St. Peter's Dunboyne 2-5, 0-10 Navan O'Mahonys, Ratoath,

Group B

Round 1:
 Cortown 0-6, 0-5 Blackhall Gaels, Pairc Tailteann,
 Kilmainhamwood 1-8, 0-10 Walterstown, Pairc Tailteann,
 Seneschalstown 2-10, 1-11 Dunderry, Pairc Tailteann,
 St. Patrick's 0-12, 1-7 Summerhill, Walterstown,

Round 2:
 Blackhall Gaels 0-8, 0-8 Seneschalstown, Skryne,
 Kilmainhamwood 2-11, 0-14 Dunderry, Pairc Tailteann,
 St. Patrick's 0-10, 0-8 Walterstown, Donore,
 Summerhill 2-9, 1-8 Cortown,

Round 3:
 Cortown 3-7, 1-10 Seneschalstown, Pairc Tailteann,
 Blackhall Gaels 2-14, 1-6 Kilmainhamwood,
 Dunderry 0-10, 1-5 St. Patrick's, Walterstown,
 Walterstown 1-7, 0-6 Summerhill, Pairc Tailteann,

Round 4:
 Blackhall Gaels 4-17, 0-7 St. Patrick's, Ratoath, 
 Kilmainhamwood 0-12, 0-8 Seneschalstown, Kells,
 Cortown 0-10, 0-9 Walterstown, Pairc Tailteann,
 Dunderry 0-9, 0-7 Summerhill, Dunsany,

Round 5:
 Blackhall Gaels 0-13, 0-12 Summerhill, Longwood,
 Kilmainhamwood 2-6, 0-9 Cortown,
 Seneschalstown 0-11, 0-8 St. Patrick's, Duleek,
 Walterstown 2-13, 1-3 Dunderry, Simonstown,

Round 6:
 Cortown 0-12, 0-10 Dunderry, Bohermeen,
 Blackhall Gaels 0-10, 0-6 Walterstown, Pairc Tailteann,
 St. Patrick's 2-11, 1-5 Kilmainhamwood, Rathkenny,
 Seneschalstown 3-5, 1-6 Summerhill, Dunsany,

Round 7:
 Blackhall Gaels 1-10, 1-4 Dunderry, Dunsany, 
 Summerhill 1-12, 1-9 Kilmainhamwood, Pairc Tailteann,
 Walterstown 1-9, 0-6 Seneschalstown, Skryne,
 Cortown 0-10, 1-7 St. Patrick's, Walterstown,

Knock-out Stage

Relegation Play Off
In Group B, 2 teams finished on equal points. To decide who would play Gaeil Colmcille (Bottom Group A) in the Relegation Final, a Preliminary Relegation Play Off was played between Summerhill and Dunderry.

Preliminary Relegation Play Off:
 Dunderry 1-14, 1-12 Summerhill, Trim, (AET)

Relegation Final:
 Summerhill 1-12, 1-6 Gaeil Colmcille, Athboy, 17/10/2004,

Finals

Quarter-final:
 Trim 4-5, 1-8 Seneschalstown, Dunsany, 5/9/2004,
 Simonstown Gaels 0-20, 0-12 Kilmainhamwood, Pairc Tailteann, (AET) 5/9/2004,
 Skryne 1-13, 1-8 Cortown, Pairc Tailteann, 5/9/2004, 
 Dunshaughlin 0-16, 0-14 Blackhall Gaels, Pairc Tailteann, (AET) 5/9/2004,

Semi-final:
 Simonstown Gaels 2-13, 0-6 Trim, Pairc Tailteann, 19/9/2004,
 Skryne 1-11, 0-14 Dunshaughlin, Pairc Tailteann, (AET) 19/9/2004,

Semi-final Replay:
 Skryne 0-15, 1-7 Dunshaughlin, Pairc Tailteann, 26/9/2004,

Final:
 Skryne 1-9, 0-7 Simonstown Gaels, Pairc Tailteann, 10/10/2004,

References

External links

Meath Senior Football Championship
Meath Senior Football Championship